Colin Bean (15 April 1926 – 20 June 2009) was an English actor. He was best known for his role as Private Sponge in the BBC comedy series Dad's Army.

Early life
Born in Wigan, Lancashire, Bean's father played football for local side Wigan Borough, and he attended Wigan Grammar School. Bean's first appearance had been as a shepherd in a school play, and much against paternal intentions, he took up acting professionally until being called up for national service. He served for four years in the British Army after World War II, spending some time in Japan, and taking the opportunity to continue his acting by joining the British Commonwealth Occupation Force (BCOF). After graduating from drama school in 1952, he joined the Sheffield Rep as assistant stage manager; regular theatre work followed.

Career
His work in Dad's Army came as a result of working at Watford Rep in 1962 under series co-writer Jimmy Perry as the company's actor-manager, in addition to almost 20 years of playing a pantomime dame. His role in Dad's Army started off relatively small but grew as the series progressed, in 1997 he said ‘by the time of The Miser's Hoard I’d ended up on the front row of the platoon, it was a lovely feeling. Instead of peering and smirking over Jones’ shoulder, I was on the front line. It was very satisfying.’ His TV appearances were varied, including Z-Cars, The Gnomes of Dulwich, The Liver Birds, 13 episodes of Michael Bentine Time, Are You Being Served?, and the penultimate episode of Hi-de-Hi! (1988).

Due to his arthritis, in his later years he concentrated on his radio work. He wrote his autobiography, Who Do You Think You Are Kidding!, which was published in 1998 and went into two editions.

Though using a wheelchair in his later years, he continued to make sporadic appearances on stage in the North West of England discussing his long acting career. He was also a regular at Dad's Army reunions. He continued to live in the Scholes area of his native Wigan until his death, aged 83, in Wigan Infirmary, on 20 June 2009.

Filmography

Television

References

External links
 
 Obituary in The Independent
 Obituary in The Guardian
 Colin Bean BFI

1926 births
2009 deaths
20th-century English male actors
20th-century English male writers
British Army personnel of World War II
British Army soldiers
British male comedy actors
English male radio actors
English male television actors
Male actors from Lancashire
Military personnel from Lancashire
People from Wigan